The Auckland Philharmonia Orchestra (APO) is a symphony orchestra based in Auckland, New Zealand.  Its principal concert venue is the Auckland Town Hall.  The APO is the accompanying ensemble for performances by NZ Opera and the Royal New Zealand Ballet in Auckland.  The APO's patrons are Dame Catherine Tizard, Dame Kiri Te Kanawa and Dame Rosanne Meo.

History
In 1980, 19 musicians of the collapsed Symphonia of Auckland founded a new cooperatively run orchestra under the legal entity of the Auckland Philharmonia Society Inc. This was made possible by a local business man Olly Newland, who, at some financial risk to himself, held what assets remained of the Symphonia, and organised several public rallies to garner support. He continued to serve on the Board of Management for some years afterwards.  From 1980 to 2005, the Auckland Philharmonia Society focused on artistic management of the orchestra, and delegated financial responsibility to a Board of Advisors and Management.  In 2005, a structural change in the organisation produced two principal stakeholders, the Auckland Philharmonia Society and the Auckland Philharmonia Foundation.  The Society concentrates on artistic and operational functions, whilst the Foundation focuses on management of the APO's capital assets fund.

John Hopkins was principal conductor of the APO for 8 years.  Other conductors who have worked as artistic advisors to the APO include Edvard Tchivzhel, Vladimir Verbitsky and Enrique Diemecke.  Miguel Harth-Bedoya was music director of the APO from 1998 to 2005.  From 2009 until 2015, the orchestra's Music Director was Eckehard Stier. In February 2015, the APO announced the appointment of Giordano Bellincampi as its next music director, effective in 2016, with an initial contract of 3 years. Other affiliated APO conductors have included Roy Goodman, principal guest conductor from 2009 to 2011.

The APO maintains several artistic partnerships with entities such as the Auckland Festival, the Michael Hill International Violin Competition, and the Atamira dance company.  Its educational work includes a partnership with the Ministry for Culture and Heritage in the Sistema Aotearoa programme (based on the El Sistema programme from Venezuela).

Music Directors
 Miguel Harth-Bedoya (1998–2003)
 Eckehard Stier (2009–2015)
 Giordano Bellincampi (2016–)

Composers-in-Residence
1990 Ivan Zagni
1991 Eve de Castro-Robinson
1992 Andrew Perkins
1993 Martin Lodge
1994 Helen Bowater
1995 Nigel Keay
1996 Jaz Coleman
1997 Leonie Holmes
1998 Jonathan Besser
1999 David Hamilton
2000 – 2001 Gillian Whitehead
2002 – 2003 John Rimmer
2004 Dylan Lardelli & Anthony Young
2005 – 2006 Ross Harris
2007 – 2008 Gareth Farr & Karlo Margetić (Young Composer in Residence)
2009 Chris Adams
2010 – 2011 John Psathas
2012 – 2013 Jack Body
2014 – 2015 Kenneth Young
2016 – 2017 Karlo Margetić
The Composer in Residence position was discontinued in 2018.

References

External links
 
 University of Melbourne biography of John Hopkins

New Zealand orchestras
Musical groups from Auckland